Patrick Connolly (14 April 1901 – 18 February 1969) was a Scottish footballer who played as an outside right, primarily for Celtic where his role was as a provider of crosses for prolific goalscorer Jimmy McGrory. He made over 300 total appearances for the Glasgow club, winning the Scottish Football League title in 1925–26 as well as playing in five Scottish Cup finals (three victories in 1923, 1925, 1927 in which he scored and set up the other two goals; two defeats in 1926 and 1928). At the end of the 1920s, Bertie Thomson was signed to replace him, but he was reluctant to leave the club and instead went out on loan several times.

He later spent half a season with Hibernian, helping them to re-gain promotion to the top tier as winners of 1932–33 Scottish Division Two.

Connolly was selected by the Scottish Football League XI once, in 1926.

References

1901 births
1969 deaths
Footballers from Hamilton, South Lanarkshire
Association football outside forwards
Scottish footballers
Greenock Morton F.C. players
Armadale F.C. players
Bo'ness F.C. players
Airdrieonians F.C. (1878) players
Celtic F.C. players
Third Lanark A.C. players
Hibernian F.C. players
Kirkintilloch Rob Roy F.C. players
Scottish Junior Football Association players
Scottish Football League players
Scottish Football League representative players
Shelbourne F.C. players
League of Ireland players
Scottish expatriate sportspeople in Ireland
Expatriate association footballers in the Republic of Ireland
Scottish expatriate footballers